The 2012–13 UMKC Kangaroos men's basketball team represented the University of Missouri–Kansas City during the 2012–13 NCAA Division I men's basketball season. The Kangaroos, led by sixth year head coach Matt Brown, played their home games at the Swinney Recreation Center, with one home game at the Municipal Auditorium, and were members of The Summit League. They finished the season 8–24, 5–11 in The Summit League play to finish in a tie for seventh place. They lost in the quarterfinals of The Summit League tournament to North Dakota State.

Following the season, head coach Matt Brown was fired after posting a record of 64–122 in six seasons.

This was UMKC's last year as a member of The Summit League as they will join the Western Athletic Conference in July 2013.

Roster

Schedule

|-
!colspan=9| Exhibition

|-
!colspan=9| Regular season

|-
!colspan=9| 2013 The Summit League men's basketball tournament

References

Kansas City Roos men's basketball seasons
UMKC
UMKC Kanga
UMKC Kanga